Luke Chute is an unincorporated community in Washington County, in the U.S. state of Ohio.

History
A post office called Luke Chute was established in 1880, and remained in operation until 1901. According to tradition, the name of the community is derived from the command from a father to his son while hunting, specifically "Luke shoot, or give up the gun".

References

Unincorporated communities in Washington County, Ohio
Unincorporated communities in Ohio